Ercole contro i tiranni di Babilonia (English Translation: Hercules and the Tyrants of Babylon) is a 1964 Italian sword-and-sandal film directed by Domenico Paolella and starring Peter Lupus.

Plot 
Asparia, Queen of the Hellenes, has been captured by the Babylonians, but she manage to hide her identity and lives as a common slave in Babylon. Hercules, played by Peter Lupus (credited as Rock Stevens), is sent to free her. The Babylonian slavers begin to hear rumors and stories of a single man who can overcome any army he faces. Asparia conspires with another slave to send a message of her whereabouts to Hercules, who soon is heading towards Babylon.

The three siblings who rule Babylon—beautiful Taneal, warlike Salman Osar and more conservative Azzur—are visited by King Phaleg of Assyria.  Phaleg showers the three with gifts, offering up untold riches in exchange for all of the slaves in Babylon.  The siblings are suspicious of Phaleg's motives, thinking he means to raise an army from the slaves. Taneal seduces and drugs the Assyrian king, discovering that he intends to find Queen Asparia and marry her, creating a powerful empire of Assyria and Hellas.  The siblings agree to stop this, and send troops to ambush the king.  Hercules discovers the plan and aids the Assyrians, as the Babylonians are his enemy, and saves the life of the king. Phaleg makes Hercules take a loyalty oath, and then sends him to Babylon, along with several of his men, to retrieve Asparia.

In Babylon, each of the siblings is conspiring against the other; Salman Osar and Azzur both wish to marry Asparia and form an empire, while Taneal intends to steal the wealth of the city and then destroy it by the means of a giant subterranean wheel which supports the foundation of all Babylon. Hercules is able to locate Asparia, and then begins to turn the giant wheel and destroy the city. Salman Osar kills his brother, then is crushed by falling debris while attempting to kill his sister. As Hercules' Assyrian escorts attempt to steal Asparia away to Phaleg, Taneal takes the Queen hostage herself.  Phaleg and his large contingent of cavalry ride in to claim his new bride, but they are met by Hercules as well as the freed Babylonian slaves. Phaleg is killed by Hercules, and his soldiers routed; Taneal seemingly poisons herself rather than face the judgement of Hercules and Asparia.  In the end, Hercules leads Asparia and the Hellenes back to their homeland.

Reception
The Lexicon of International Films describes the work as a "trivial sandal film based on common patterns that carefree mixes poetry and (historical) truth".

The cinema magazine Cinema rated the film as a respectable spectacle and as upscale trash with entertainment value.

Crew

Director: Domenico Paolella
Assistant director : Giancarlo Romitelli
Writer: Luciano Martino and Domenico Paolella
Cinematography	: Augusto Tiezzi, Totalscope Eastmancolor
Length: 94 min 				
Producer: Fortunato Misiano
Music: Angelo Francesco Lavagnino
Distributor :	Cosmopolis Films et les Films Marbeuf
Country of origin: Italy, Romana Film  Rome
Editing: Jolanda Benvenuti
Released 24
Adapted by Michel Lucklin
 Models and costumes by : Walter Patriarca
Makeup: Massimo Giustini
Genre : Sword-and-sandal

Starring

 Peter Lupus (as Rock Stevens) : Hercules
 Anna-Maria Polani : Asparia, queen of Hellenes
 Helga Liné : Taneal
 Mario Petri : Phaleg, king of Assyrians
 Livio Lorenzon : Salmanassar
 Tullio Altamura : Azzur
 Franco Balducci : Moksor
 Rosy De Leo : slave Gilda
 Andrea Scotti : a young shepherd
 Diego Pozzetto : Behar
 Mirko Valentin : Glicon
 Diego Michelotti : Crissipos
 Eugenio Bottai : Minister of Assur
 Emilio Messina : warrior
 Pietro Torrisi : warrior
 Gilberto Galimberti : warrior
 Amerigo Santarelli : warrior
 Puccio Ceccarelli : warrior

See also
 Sword and sandal
 List of films in the public domain in the United States

Sources

External links 
 
 

1964 films
1960s fantasy films
1960s adventure drama films
1960s action adventure films
1964 adventure films
Italian historical adventure films
Italian action adventure films
1960s Italian-language films
Films about royalty
American International Pictures films
Peplum films
Films directed by Domenico Paolella
Films set in Babylon
Films set in Iraq
Films scored by Angelo Francesco Lavagnino
Sword and sandal films
Historical epic films
Films about Heracles
Assyrian culture
1960s Italian films